Zuleykha Seyidmammadova (22 March 1919 – 1994) was one of the first Azerbaijani female pilots, and the first Azerbaijani woman to fly in combat.

Seyidmammadova was born in Baku on 22 March 1919. She gained her pilot's license in 1935 at a flying club in her hometown, and later at the aviation academy in Zhukovsky near Moscow. In 1938 she became qualified as a petrochemical engineer but chose to pursue aviation as her main career.

During World War II, she was the regimental navigator of the 586th Fighter Aviation Regiment, one of the three women's military aviation regiments founded by Marina Raskova. Throughout the war, she fought in over 40 aerial battles and carried out over 500 missions. During the war, she would inform the commissar as well as Tamara Kazarinova, the commander of her regiment, about the pilots' attitudes toward their leadership.

After the war, she was demobilized and in 1952 she became the Minister of Social Security of the Azerbaijan SSR. Seyidmammadova died in Baku in 1994.

Biography

Early Years
Zuleykha Seyidmammadova was born on March 22, 1919, in Baku. Her father, Mir Habib Agha, received her first education at a religious school, and later studied at the Baku real school. Mir Habib Agha was an accountant and was considered the right hand of a Baku millionaire  Haji Zeynalabdin Taghiyev. Mir Habib, who was a friend of Haji Zeynalabdin Taghiyev since childhood, was very loyal to Haji, so Haji had great respect for him. Mir Habib Agha's magnificent property in  Mardakan was also the result of his loyalty to Haji. Zuleykha Seyidmammadova's mother, Mina Khanim, was uneducated and was married off at the age of 11. Zuleikha was the second daughter born in their marriage.

Zuleykha was a teacher at school number 16, and her parents wanted her to get a higher education and become an oil engineer.

Her interest in heights arose from childhood. In her memories, Seyidmammadova explained her desire for the sky and the reason for her aspiration for greatness as follows:

"I loved the height. Every summer, together with our family, we moved outside the city to our garden in the village of Shuvelan. There were fig and mulberry trees here. I would choose the highest one and climb on top of it. I liked to look down on the flat roofs of the houses, the gardens, the vineyards, the sea with white pebbles on the shore..."

This dream of her is determined during her school years. Thus, when Zuleykha was studying in the 7th grade, the physics  teacher Jumshud Efendiyev took them on an excursion to the Baku airport. Zuleykha gets on the plane several times with the boys in the class, looks at everything carefully, and asks countless questions. When she returned home in the evening, she enthusiastically told her mother Mina about this excursion: "I will become a pilot!" she says.

Higher Education

Zuleikha Seyidmammadova, who graduated from high school with excellent grades in 1934, entered the mining faculty of the Azerbaijan State Oil and Industry University. In early 1934, Zuleykha, who went to the Baku airfield with her fellow students, took to the sky for the first time with the "U-2" plane. After this trip, she and her fellow students decide to form an aero club at the institute. The students succeeded to purchase a U-2 aircraft for the club, as well as three gliders and two parachutes, with their stipends. The club was inaugurated on January 6, 1934. In the spring of 1934, the government allocated space for this aviation club in Zabrat settlement, and the students helped closely in the organization of the area. After long-term training, in October 1934, Zuleykha Seyidmammadova took off for the first time alone with the "U-2" plane. In late 1934, she graduated from the aero club with honors and received her certificate, thereby earning the title of pilot.

In May 1935, several students try out a parachute jump. Zuleikha, a thin, skinny, black-haired girl, jumps out of a plane with a parachute and the wind throws her into the sea. According to what was said, Mir Jafar Baghirov, the first secretary of the Central Committee of the Communist Party of Azerbaijan, was among those who watched her jump and expressed his surprise at Zuleykha's courage.

In August 1935, the First All-Union meeting of Paratroopers was held in Moscow, and Zuleikha was the only girl among the representatives representing Transcaucasia. At the meeting, the Transcaucasia team takes first place in terms of landing accuracy. Seyidmammadova was appointed as a parachuting instructor for 50 parachute jumps from an airplane. She returns with honors from the meeting she attended as the first female paratrooper from Transcaucasia, as well as from the Muslim East. The courage of an Eastern Muslim woman to jump with a parachute arouses everyone's astonishment, and Seyidmammadova's activity is marked as an achievement of the Soviet system and widely commented on in the press.

On January 21, 1936, a ceremonial reception was held in the Kremlin in connection with the fifteenth anniversary of the establishment of Soviet power in Azerbaijan, and Komsomol member Zuleykha Seyidmammadova was awarded the Order of Honor and a gold watch.

Returning to Baku, Zuleykha finished special courses at the flight club and received the title of pilot instructor. A group of accountants is assigned to train her. One of the eight people in that group is her former physics teacher Jumshud Efendiyev. While studying the last year of the Azerbaijan Industrial Institute, Seyidmammadova had already flown up to a hundred hours and trained 75 pilots and 80 parachutists in three years as an instructor.

After graduating from the institute as an engineer-geologist in 1938, she applied to the Zhukovsky Air Force Engineering Academy to become a professional pilot, but the academy, which accepted only men, rejected her. She goes to meet Mir Jafar Bagirov with her father's advice. Based on Zuleikha's request, who was remembered by Bagirov as a "girl thrown into the sea by the wind", the Central Committee officially sends a letter to Moscow for her admission to the academy.

In August 1938, Zuleikha Seyidmammadova was the only girl among those admitted to the navigation faculty of the academy after taking the test exams. Seyidmammadova was also the first Azerbaijani to be admitted to the Zhukovsky Air Force Academy.

Züleykha, who was studying at the academy at the moment, was shocked by sudden news one day. The dean of the faculty called her to his office and informed her that her father was arrested as a spy, and if they confirm this information from Baku, she will be removed from the academy. Zuleykha turns to Baghirov again as her last hope in the face of this news. She sends a telegram to Baghirov:

"To Comrade Bagirov, First Secretary of the Communist Party of Azerbaijan! “The enemies of the State” want to tarnish my father’s reputation. They gave false information to the Air Force Academy where I am currently studying. I was sent to study here by the republic. I am the only girl among the students. After receiving the necessary information, they will decide whether I can continue to study here or not. Please protect the rights and justice so that they do not receive any false information."

Bagirov soon releases her father from prison in order not to damage the reputation of the country, and he is ordered not to talk about it anywhere. Thus, a letter goes to Moscow with the necessary content to Zuleykha: "It is a lie, Mir Habib Seyidmammadov is at home. Everything is in order."

During her studies at the academy, Seyidmammadova began to receive training on travelling with "Douglas" and then medium bombers, as well as long-range and fast-flying aircraft. She learns all the secrets of airships from Spirin and Belyakov, the strongest navigators of the country, and heroes of the Soviet Union. The photo of Seyidmammadova, a first-year student, was placed on the Academy's "Board of Honor" by the Komsomol organization of the faculty headed by Gurevich.

On February 23, 1940 - Red Army Day, Seyidmammadova was given the rank of junior lieutenant.

Zuleikha, who is the only woman in the piloting faculty of the academy, is appointed pilot of a fighter aircraft in the training aircraft regiment after graduation.

Awards

 Order of Lenin
 Two Orders of the Red Banner of Labour
 Order of the Patriotic War in the 2nd Class
 Order of the Red Star
 Two Orders of the Badge of Honor

See also

 Leyla Mammadbeyova – first Azerbaijani woman pilot, but did not fly in combat
 Ziba Ganiyeva – Azerbaijani woman sniper

References

1919 births
1994 deaths
Azerbaijani women aviators
Military personnel from Baku
Women air force personnel of the Soviet Union
Soviet military personnel of World War II
Members of the Supreme Soviet of the Azerbaijan Soviet Socialist Republic
Soviet women in politics
20th-century Azerbaijani women politicians
20th-century Azerbaijani politicians
Azerbaijan State Oil and Industry University alumni
Recipients of the Order of Lenin
Recipients of the Order of the Red Star
Recipients of the Order of the Red Banner of Labour